Bunny Phyoe (also spelt Bunny Phyo; born Pyae Phyo Paing; born 9 July 1992) is a Burmese singer, songwriter, and actor in Myanmar. He is best known for his R&B and Pop Music.

Early life and education
Bunny Phyoe was born on 9 July 1992 in Yangon. His original name is Pyae Phyoe Paing.He is an eldest son of two siblings. He studied at Basic Education High School No. 6 Botataung, and passed his matriculation examination in 2008. He graduated, majoring in English, from Eastern Yangon University.

Career

Music career
He has had a great interest in music since he was at a young age. When he was in Grade 5, he recomposed a song called Ta Yauk Htae from the album of Nga Ko Chit Mae Thu song by R Zarni, by adding some hip-hop lyrics. He participated in Myanmar Traditional and Cultural Performing Arts Competition in 2000 and 2012 respectively.

Once he had passed his matriculation exam, he started composing songs together with a band called Southern Born. Shortly after, he began distributing some self-made songs. At the time, it was popular to share the self-made songs online and his songs were shared online. Since then, he gained the first recognition from his fans. In 2009, he was first contacted by Htein Win, who was a member of Rock Star group. Since then he started working with mainstream artists. At the same time, he also sang a lot of songs, cooperating with Kiki Kyaw Zaw and sang together with artists from Frenzo Production of Sai Sai Kham Leng. In the same year, he started singing on the stage in Thadingyut Festival organized by Bo Bo Entertainment.  Since 2011, Bunny Phyoe started entertaining in Sai Sai Kham Leng's birthday show every year. In 2013, he featured in three songs of Sai Sai Kham Leng's Latest album, Date Date Kyel.
He has become popular due to A Lwan Pyay A Nan song included in Pyaw Sayar Gyi album. At the same time, Bunny Phyo started endeavoring to be able to produce and distribute a solo album. He launched his debut album Chit Tel Hote on 20 November 2011. Chit Tel Hote video album was released on 19 December 2012. His second album called Lu Pyo Hlae Tay was released on 1 December 2013.

After that, his first digital mini-album, My Little Birthday Treat was distributed via the internet. In the following three months, a dual album called DUO was released together with his friend and singer Ki Ki Kyaw Zaw. Lu Pyo Hlae Tay video album was released on 4 October 2015.

On 20 November 2016, the day on which the 5th anniversary of debut album, Chit Tel Hote, he released his 3rd studio album "Lucky." On 7 September 2018, his latest album called "Neon Dreams" was released. "Neon Dreams" album features Electro Pop music mostly and since his debut, his music style has been different from most Burmese artists and he has been composing and producing the styles of music which follow Electronic Dance Music. On 1 April 2019, Frenzo released an animation music video for "Nga Yee Zar Ka Po Mite Tal" (My girlfriend is better than yours) collaborating with Frenzo artists Bunny Phyoe, Sai Sai Kham Leng, Nay Win, Phyo Lay, Ki Ki Kyaw Zaw, G Fatt and John, which is one of the tracks in Sai Sai Kham Leng's album "Sai Sai is Sai Sai", was released on 1 April 2018. The music video became widely popular since the day released it on Sai Sai Kham Leng's official Facebook page and YouTube channel, and was praised for the animation quality and music video created by Pencell Studio. That music video was earned 1 M views within 24 hours and then 2 M views in 7 days.

Acting career
He has been presenting and acting in a travel documentary called "Let's Go" together with other artists, Hlwan Paing, Kyaw Htut Swe, Nan Thu Zar, Nan Myat Phyo Thin, and Bobby Soxer.

While he planned to present in "Let's Go To Europe", an extension of Let's Go Programme, he also started acting his first main-character TV serie named "CHARM" directed by Thar Nyi in February 2016. Both seasons of CHARM have been shown on MNTV and Channel 9

Advertising
He was assigned as brand ambassador of Sony earphones in 2015 and also as brand ambassador of Coca-Cola in 2016.

Tours
In December 2014, he performed his first solo concert called Dreamworld Concert 2014. He went to Singapore to entertain in 2014 and 2015, respectively with Frenzo Production program; and he also travelled and entertained in Australia and the USA in 2015.

Discography

Solo albums
 "ချစ်တယ်ဟုတ်" Chit Tel Hote (Love me?) (2012)
 "လူပျိုလှည့်တေး" Lu Pyo Hlae Tay (Bachelors' Song) (2015)
 "လပ်ကီး" Lucky (Lucky) (2016)
 "နီယွန်အိပ်မက်များ" Neon Dreams(2018)

Dual album
 DUO (2014)

Collaborative albums
 "ပျော်စရာကြီး" Pyaw Sayar Gyi
 "ချစ်တယ်" Chit Tel
 "ချစ်သူ့အနား" Chit Thu A Nar
 "ဖြစ်ချင်ရင်ဖြစ်အောင်လုပ်" "Phyit Chit Yin Phyit Aung Lote"
 "ဟစ်ဟော့စစ်သည်" Hip Hop Sit The
 "ဒိတ်ဒိတ်ကြဲ" Date Date Kyel
 "ဂီတစာဆို" Gi Ta Sar So
 "ခါချနေရတယ်" Khar Cha Nay Ya Tel

Filmography

Television series
Charm (2016)

Personal life
Bunny Phyoe was in relationship with Hanna Yuri, a makeup artist and model, and posted photos of them on Facebook. She appeared in two of Bunny Phyoe's music videos, Hnit Pat Lel and Ma Net 4 Nar Yee. In 2016, he answered in an interview that his relationship with Hanna Yuri had ended.

He celebrated his 24th birthday with orphans and his fans at a KFC fast food restaurant in Yangon on 9 July 2016.

References

External links
BUNNY PHYOE |*B*| The Official Website

1992 births
21st-century Burmese male actors
21st-century Burmese male singers
Burmese singer-songwriters
Burmese Theravada Buddhists
People from Yangon
Living people